Roger Eykyn (21 October 1830 – 14 November 1896) was an English Liberal Party politician who sat in the House of Commons from 1866 to 1874.

Early life
Robert Eykyn was born on 21 October 1830. He was the son of Richard Eykyn of Crouch End, Middlesex, and Ackleton, Shropshire and his wife Susanna Starr, daughter of Sir William Starr, of Canterbury, Kent.

Political career
Eykyn was a J.P. for Berkshire, and a cornet in the Royal Buckinghamshire Yeomanry Lancers.
 
In 1866 Eykyn was elected at a by-election as a Member of Parliament (MP) for Windsor  after the return of the previous general election was declared void. He held the seat until his defeat at the 1874 general election.

Personal life
Eykym married firstly Maria Prinald Schlotel, daughter of George Schlotel of Essex Lodge, Streatham, Surrey. She died in October 1866 and he married secondly in 1868, the Hon. Mary Caroline Mostyn, daughter of the 6th Baron Vaux of Harrowden.

Death
Eykyn died at the age of 66.

References

External links

1830 births
1896 deaths
Liberal Party (UK) MPs for English constituencies
UK MPs 1865–1868
UK MPs 1868–1874
People from Windsor, Berkshire
Place of birth missing